Patrick Martin Deane (born 16 April 1990) is a Scottish footballer. Deane came through the youth system at Scottish Premier League side Hibernian, but was released in 2009. He then made 10 appearances in The Football League for Darlington, but was again released in 2010.

Career
Deane played in the youth and reserve teams for Hibernian, and was part of the side that won a youth league and cup double in 2009. Deane was one of seven players, including David Wotherspoon and Kurtis Byrne, who were given senior contacts by the club in March 2009. Without making an appearance for the first team, however, Deane was released by Hibs towards the end of the summer 2009 transfer window. New manager John Hughes had decided that Deane, David van Zanten and Jonatan Johansson were surplus to his requirements. Deane then played as a trialist for Montrose in a Scottish Football League match against Berwick Rangers a month later.

Darlington signed Deane on a deal until the end of the 2009–10 season during January 2010. He made his debut for Darlington on 19 January against Rotherham United, coming on as a substitute in the game, which ended in a 2–1 win for his new club. Deane was released by the club following their relegation from Football League Two, along with 13 other players.

Deane signed for Arbroath in October 2010. He joined the club at the same time as Ross Chisholm, another former Hibernian youth product.

On 16 September 2011 it was announced that Deane had joined Jeanfield Swifts.

References

External links 

1990 births
Living people
Scottish footballers
Association football forwards
Hibernian F.C. players
Montrose F.C. players
Darlington F.C. players
Arbroath F.C. players
Scottish Football League players
English Football League players
Jeanfield Swifts F.C. players
Footballers from Perth, Scotland
Scottish Junior Football Association players